Baake is a German surname. Notable people with this name include:

 Ellen Baake (born 1961), German mathematical biologist
  (born 1931), Academy Award nominated German documentary film director
 Hans-Jürgen Baake (born 1954), German footballer
 Werner Baake (1918–1964), German World War II flying ace

See also
 Bake (surname)

German-language surnames